Martial Angels is a 2001 Hong Kong film directed by Clarence Fok Yiu-leung.

The film has been described as part of the "girls with guns revival" cycle of the early 2000s. Other films in this subgenre included The Wesley's Mysterious File (2002) and So Close.

Plot

Martial Angel tells of Cat (Shu Qi), a professional thief turned straight after leaving her lover, Chi Lam (Julian Cheung), two years before. But her past returns to haunt her as Chi Lam is kidnapped for the ransom of security software belonging to the company Cat works for. In order to rescue him, she calls on her old friends from her orphanage days, six other feisty women, to save the day...

The basic story starts with a pair of burglars who meet in action and some sparks fly, but the two soon break up and move on. The female burglar is Cat and she soon meets up with some other female burglars, seven of them to be exact. When her former partner ends up in trouble and needs help, Cat and her newfound friends have to take action, before it is too late. She is forced to steal a top secret product in exchange for his life, but of course, it won’t be that simple. As factors shift and alliances are formed & broken in quick fashion, who will emerge on top?

Cast
 Julian Cheung - Zi-Yang
 Shu Qi - Cat
 Kelly Lin - Octopus
 Sandra Ng - Monkey
 Teresa Mak - Goldfish
 Rachel Ngan - Pigeon
 Terence Yin - Bone
 Rosemary Vandenbroucke - Peacock
 Amanda Strang - Spider
 Wong Jing - Fred
 Ron Smoorenburg - Paracov
 Max Ruddock - Barry, henchmen

See also
 Girls with guns

References

External links

 Hong Kong Cinemagic entry
 lovehkfilm entry

2001 films
Hong Kong action films
2000s Hong Kong films